Kesselbach is a small river of Baden-Württemberg, Germany. It branches off the Ursentalbach near Nendingen, and flows into the Danube in Stetten, downstream from the mouth of the Ursentalbach.

See also
List of rivers of Baden-Württemberg

Rivers of Baden-Württemberg
Rivers of Germany